10:10 is a 2008 Bengali comedy film directed by Arin Paul. It features Soumitra Chatterjee, Kanchan Mullick, Claudia Ciesla, Subrata Dutta, Aparajita Ghosh Das and Abir Chatterjee.

Production
The movie was released on 28 November 2008. 10:10 is a comedy set in Calcutta. 10:10 is also the debut film of its director (Arin Paul), lead actors (Chirasree Singha Roy & Ahmed), cinematographer (Basab Mullik), music director (Drono Acharya), editor (Aravinda Dasgupta) and a few others.

Plot
Durgaprasad an aged don wants to be a more successful don and would like to be in the league of Dawood Ibrahim who he considers to be his idol. To keep him company at all times he has two sidekicks in the form of Montu Singh and Jhantu Singh and Montu of the very shrill voice and loves to play with toy guns. Durgarasad's daughter Ranjita is in love with Aparatim a struggling actor. Ranjita has a couple of friends who are journalists and wants to do a story about the underworld and the underworld dons of the city. One of the friends asks Ranjita to help her write a story on Durgaprasad as he lives in Ranjita's lane. Meanwhile, Durgaprasad's outgoing calls are barred and he sends Montu with 50,000 rupees, the outstanding amount to the shop to clear his bills so that he can again start receiving calls. Montu pays the amount, but misplaces Durgaprasad's number by a single digit and so the entire number is credited to the amount account of Apratim. Durgaprasad is furious that his phone is still not working and likes Montu and goes to the shop to find out exactly what happened. He learns that his number is misplaced and the amount has been credited to Apratim though he is unaware of his real identity. His men threaten Apratim and tells him to repay the money or otherwise they will finish him. Ranjita tells her friends about her father's real identity. Her friends decide to take the help of the rival don Muktadhara to face Durgaprasad. Durgaprasad decides to finish off Apratim the next day, but he has an unpleasant dream at night and he wakes up the next day at 10:10, the time at which he was supposed to bump off Apratim and turns a new leaf.

Cast
 Soumitra Chatterjee as Durgaprasad
 Subrat Dutta as Aparatim
 Aparajita Ghosh Das as Ranjita
 Claudia Ciesla as Serin
 Kanchan Mullick as Montu
 Abir Chatterjee as Abhishek
 Parambrata Chatterjee - Guest appearance

Soundtrack

Drono Acharya composed the film's songs and Ritam Sen, Sandip Chakrabarty, Padmanabha Dasgupta, Rana Basu Thakur and Rangeet wrote the lyrics.

References

External links

 
 Preview in The Telegraph, Calcutta
 Morpheus Media Ventures

2008 films
2000s Bengali-language films
2008 comedy films
Indian comedy films
Films set in Kolkata
Bengali-language Indian films
2008 directorial debut films